The People's Progressive Party is a political party in Nepal. Although the party's primary base is still in Terai Madhesh area of Madhesh Province and Lumbini Province, it has tried to expand to a pan-Nepalese base.

The party was officially announced on 14 December 2021. Hridayesh Tripathi is the coordinator of the party.

History

2017 elections 
As of August 2021, the party members had filled their candidacy as an Independent political group in the 2017 Nepalese general election. They used sun as their election symbol, as a part of agreement/alliance between CPN (UML) and the group.  Brijesh Kumar Gupta And Hridayesh Tripathi won as member of the House of Representatives. Similarly, Ajay Shahi and Dharma Lal Shrivastava won as candidate in the provincial assembly elections to the Provincial Assembly of Lumbini Province. However Ishwar Dayal Mishra and Pashupati Dayal Mishra couldn't manage to win the election.

The party was expected to get registered much earlier while it was reported that the process had already started in July. The party got registered in December before the 2022 National Assembly elections.

Formation and registration at Election Commission 
The party formation was declared on 14 December 2021 amidst a press conference at Everest Hotel, Kathmandu. Former speaker of House of Representatives Daman Nath Dhungana, MP Brijesh Kumar Gupta, economist Rameshwar Khanal and Tul Narayan Sah joined newly announced the party while they were also present during the party declaration.

On 11 February 2021, the party was registered at Election Commission with central committee with thirty members. Hridayesh Tripathi from Lumbini Province was declared president, Shivajee Yadav   from Madhesh Province was declared senior vice president of the party. The party appointed three vice presidents Harka Lal Singh Rajbanshi (from Province No. 1), Mohammand Shabir Hussain (from Madhesh Province) and Farhan Akwal Kha (from Lumbini Province). They party in a statement said that it had tried to keep people from all province in party portfolio. Former minister Ishwar Dayal Mishra and Bharat Kumar Thapa were appointed general secretary of the party while thirty three membered central committee was declared.

Party expansion and first election 
The party went organization development mainly in Terai belt of Lumbini province. Even within the province, the party was centred to Kapilvastu, Rupandehi and Parasi district. The party won both chairman and deputy chairman post in Marchabari rural municipality. The party emerged as first runner up in several local levels including Pratappur rural municipalitywhile winning several posts in various local levels. As a result, the party was able to decline the vote bank of CPN (UML) and traditional vote bank of Janata Samajwadi Party and Loktantrik Samajwadi Party in Lumbini province.

Ideology 
The party presented a 17 point commitment and its view on social national issues on the same day. The party remains close to left but equally committed to democracy. The party document presents the farmers as the base of the party. The party commitment claims the party of being committed to federalism, nationalism while against the Ultranationalism.

Electoral performance

Legislative elections

Local election

Presence in legislature

Federal parliament

Provincial Assemblies

List of Members of Parliament 

List of Pratinidhi Sabha members from People's Progressive Party

Leadership

Party portfolios

See also 
2021 split in Communist Party of Nepal (Unified Marxist-Leninist)
Nagrik Unmukti Party
 People's Socialist Party, Nepal
Loktantrik Samajwadi Party, Nepal
Terai Madhesh Loktantrik Party
Janamat Party
 2022 Provincial Assembly of Madhesh Province election

References 

People's Progressive Party (Nepal)
Socialist parties in Nepal
Social democratic parties in Nepal
2021 establishments in Nepal
Political parties established in 2021
Lumbini Province
Madhesh Province